Carlos Isaac may refer to:
 Carlos Isaac (athlete)
 Carlos Isaac (footballer)